Austre Åmøy Chapel is a chapel of the Church of Norway in Stavanger Municipality in Rogaland county, Norway. It is located on the eastern part of the small island of Åmøy. It is an annex chapel in the Mosterøy parish which is part of the Tungenes prosti (deanery) in the Diocese of Stavanger. The wooden chapel was built in a long church style in 1904 using designs by the architect Jæger.  The chapel seats about 120 people.

History
Historically, the island of Åmøy was divided between two different municipalities and two different parishes. This chapel was part of Stavanger Municipality and the Vardeneset parish which was part of the Ytre Stavanger prosti.  The other half of the island was the site of Vestre Åmøy Chapel. That chapel was located in Rennesøy Municipality and part of the Mosterøy parish which was part of the Tungenes prosti. 

The small chapel was constructed in 1904. In 1914, a choir was added to the west end of the building. In 1938, a small tower was added on the roof. The tower was rebuilt in 1978.

On 1 January 2020, the two municipalities were merged into Stavanger Municipality. On the same date, the Austre Åmøy chapel was transferred to the Mosterøy parish in Tungenes prosti.

See also
List of churches in Rogaland

References

Churches in Stavanger
Wooden churches in Norway
20th-century Church of Norway church buildings
Churches completed in 1904
1904 establishments in Norway